NGC 438 is an intermediate spiral galaxy of type (R')SAB(s)b: located in the constellation Sculptor. It was discovered on September 1, 1834, by John Herschel. It was described by Dreyer as "pretty faint, small, round, gradually a little brighter middle."

References

External links
 

0438
18340901
Sculptor (constellation)
Intermediate spiral galaxies
004406